James Mason (18 June 1919 – 4 December 1971) was a Scottish footballer, who played for Third Lanark and the Scotland national team.

An inside forward raised in the Dennistoun area of Glasgow, Mason played for the now defunct Third Lanark between 1936 and 1952, where he earned selection for the Scottish League representative side on seven occasions. During the Second World War he "guested" for Charlton Athletic, Portsmouth and Brentford while stationed in southern England. He also won 7 caps for the Scotland national team, scoring 4 goals.

He received a testimonial match in 1953, in which a Scotland XI defeated Sunderland. After his retirement he became a publican in the Bridgeton district of Glasgow.

See also
List of one-club men in association football

References

External links

Profile at Londonhearts.com

1919 births
1971 deaths
Footballers from Glasgow
Scottish footballers
Scotland international footballers
Third Lanark A.C. players
Scottish Football League players
Charlton Athletic F.C. wartime guest players
Brentford F.C. wartime guest players
Association football inside forwards
Scottish Football League representative players
Portsmouth F.C. wartime guest players
British publicans
People educated at Whitehill Secondary School
British military personnel of World War II